H. foliata may refer to:
 Hexaplex foliata, a synonym for Hexaplex cichoreum, a sea snail species
 Hoplocorypha foliata, a praying mantis species found in Tanzania

See also
 Foliata (disambiguation)